Galanolactone is a diterpenoid lactone first isolated from ginger. It is present in acetone extracts of ginger, and appears to be an antagonist at 5-HT3 receptors.

References 

Furanones
Diterpenes
Decalins
Epoxides
Tetrahydrofurans
Spiro compounds